The Midwest Beat is a band from Milwaukee, Wisconsin, United States. Formed in 2005, the band is noted for their concise and uptempo songs, saturated in vocal harmonies. The Midwest Beat, who play Americana music inspired by country rock and folk rock, have toured Europe three times and released a handful of full-length albums, singles and EPs.

Band members

Current line-up
Matt Joyce - guitar, vocals
Kyle Denton - guitar, vocals
Christopher Capelle - drums
Tim Schweiger - bass, vocals

Engineer
Kyle "Motor" Urban

Discography

Albums
At the Gates CD, 2009, Duck on Monkey Records
At the Gates LP, 2010, Dusty Medical Records
Gone Not Lost LP, 2011, Dusty Medical Records 
Gone Not Lost LP, 2011, Wild Honey Records 
Singles LP, 2012, Wild Honey Records
Gone Not Lost CD, 2013, Waterslide Records
Free of Being CD, 2014, Waterslide Records
Free of Being LP, 2014, Dusty Medical Records/Wild Honey Records
Incantations LP, 2020, Dusty Medical Records

EPs
Happy Holidays from The Midwest Beat CD, 2006, self-released split with The Vertebreakers
The Midwest Beat EP, CD, 2007, self-released
Live on WMSE EP, CD, 2011, self-released European tour CD

Cassettes
Belladonna split with The Cave Weddings, cassette, 2009
Sister Mary Katherine split with Eric & the Happy Thoughts, cassette, 2010
The Midwest Beat EP, cassette, 2011, Hosehead Records
Unreleased and Live: 2005-2011, cassette, 2012, Kind Turkey Records
Free of Being, cassette, 2015, Secret People Records
Incantations, cassette, 2019, No Coast Recordings

7 Inch Records
The Midwest Beat EP, 2x7", 2008, Dusty Medical Records
Bring the Water 7", 2009, Tax Return Records
Back to Mono 7", 2011, Eradicator Records
Blue Tippecanoe 7", 2012, Sound Asleep Records
Apology Accepted 7", 2012, Certified PR Records
Carol Anne 7", 2015, Wild Honey Records

Compilations
 Local Love Fest CD, 2011, includes a cover of The Hussy's "Sexi Ladi"
 Un Mondo di Canzonette - OndaDrops Vol.8, 2013, includes a cover of Neil Young's "Everybody Knows This is Nowhere"
 DMR 10th Anniversary Festival compilation CD, Dusty Medical Records (DMR-46), 2015, includes "Girl Gone West" 
 Hooliganism Vol. 3 compilation cassette, Berserk Records (CS323), 2016, includes "High Life"
 The Benefit of Things to Come compilation digital, Wild Honey Records, 2020, includes "Henhouse Blues"

Related bands
 The Beat (American band)
 Paul Collins (musician)
 Tommy Stinson

References

Milwaukee Record's 25 Best Milwaukee Albums of 2014
Milwaukee Record's 15 Best Milwaukee Music Videos of 2014
AV Club review of "Gone Not Lost" LP
June 2008 Isthmus interview
June 2011 interview
2012 show review
2012 Kind Turkey EP cassette review
2011 Kind Turkey "Back to Mono" 7" review
Italian tour info
"At the Gates" LP review
BAM Magazine (Italy)
 Discogs.com site

External links
Dusty Medical Records official band website
Bandcamp site
Online Store
Otis Tours website
Wild Honey Records website
Facebook site
Discogs band site

Musical groups from Wisconsin